Trixa is a genus of flies in the family Tachinidae.

Species
T. alpina Meigen, 1824
T. caerulescens Meigen, 1824
T. chaoi Zhang & Shima, 2005
T. chinensis Zhang & Shima, 2005
T. conspersa (Harris, 1776)
T. longipennis (Villeneuve, 1936)
T. nox (Shima, 1988)
T. pauciseta (Mesnil, 1980)
T. pellucens (Mesnil, 1967)
T. pubiseta (Mesnil, 1967)
T. pyrenaica Villeneuve, 1928
T. rufiventris (Mesnil, 1967)

References

Diptera of Europe
Dexiinae
Tachinidae genera
Taxa named by Johann Wilhelm Meigen